M. A. Maryasin was a Soviet politician, who served as People's Commissar of Social Security of the Belorussian SSR from 1921 to 1924.

References

Year of birth missing

Year of death missing

People's commissars and ministers of the Byelorussian Soviet Socialist Republic